Daniele Hamamdjian is an Egyptian-Canadian television journalist, who has been an international correspondent in the London bureau for CTV News since 2014. She is most noted as a two-time Canadian Screen Award nominee, receiving nominations for Best National Reporter at the 7th Canadian Screen Awards in 2019 for her reportage on the Rohingya conflict, and Best Editorial Research at the 10th Canadian Screen Awards in 2022 for her W5 documentary feature Consumed by Conspiracy.

Born in Cairo, Egypt, Hamamdjian emigrated with her family to Laval, Quebec, in the 1980s. She studied journalism at Concordia University, and joined CTV in 2006 as a local reporter for the network's Montreal affiliate CFCF-DT, before transferring to the parliamentary bureau in Ottawa in 2009.

References

21st-century Canadian journalists
Canadian television reporters and correspondents
Canadian women television journalists
Egyptian emigrants to Canada
Concordia University alumni
Living people
Journalists from Quebec
People from Cairo
People from Laval, Quebec
Year of birth missing (living people)